Gypsonoma dealbana, the common cloaked shoot, is a moth of the family Tortricidae.

Description
The wingspan is 11–14 mm. These moths have a creamy-white patch on the front of the head. Gypsonoma dealbana is the most variable of the species in the genus Gypsonoma in general coloration and clarity of the forewing markings. The white ground color can be overlaid by a plumbeous or brownish grey suffusion with markings less distinct and often partially obscured.

Biology
Adults are on wing from July to August. The larvae feed on a various deciduous trees, including Salix, Populus, Crataegus, Quercus and Corylus species. They window feed on the leaves in autumn and eat the buds, catkins, young shoots and then spun leaves in the spring. Pupation takes place in a cocoon in the larval habitation or in the soil.

Distribution
This species can be found in most of Europe. It is also found in the Near East and the eastern part of the Palearctic realm. These moths live in well wooded areas.

Gallery

References

External links
 Lepiforum
 The leaf and stem mines of British flies and other insects
 Microlepidoptera

Eucosmini
Moths described in 1828
Moths of Asia
Tortricidae of Europe
Moths of Japan